Kanakomyrtus is a genus of evergreen shrubs in the myrtle family Myrtaceae described as a genus in 2009. The entire genus is endemic to New Caledonia. It is related to Archirhodomyrtus and Rhodomyrtus.

Species

References

Myrtaceae
Myrtaceae genera
Endemic flora of New Caledonia